North County is a region in the northern area of San Diego County, California. It is the second-most populous region in the county (after San Diego), with an estimated population of 869,322. North County is well known for its affluence, especially in Encinitas, Carlsbad, Del Mar, Rancho Santa Fe, and Solana Beach, where house prices range, on average, above $1,000,000. Cities along the 78 freeway (Oceanside, Vista, San Marcos and Escondido) have more mixed incomes.

Beach culture is prominent in the area, and many of the region's beaches and lagoons are protected areas to help ensure the environment remains pristine, though there has been pressure from commercial entities to develop some of these areas.

History
The North County section of San Diego County has historically been the most expensive region of San Diego, with such affluent neighborhoods as Aviara, Cardiff-by-the-Sea, Carlsbad, Carmel Valley, Del Mar, Encinitas, La Costa, Leucadia, Olivenhain, Rancho Santa Fe, and Solana Beach.

In modern times, North County continues to grow as a highly influential region of Greater San Diego. The top 25 employers in San Diego County are closer to the North County city of Carlsbad than San Diego proper.

Geography
North County is commonly divided into coastal and inland regions. The coastal region is almost entirely incorporated, consisting of the cities of Oceanside, Carlsbad, Encinitas, Solana Beach and Del Mar, along with Camp Pendleton South. The inland region includes the cities of Escondido, Vista, San Marcos and Poway, as well as numerous unincorporated areas. Semi-rural inland communities such as Valley Center and Ramona, which have traditionally been primarily agricultural but now function increasingly as bedroom communities for the more populous areas to their south and west, are generally included within inland North County. More remote inland communities like Julian and Borrego Springs are generally not included. Some consider communities in the northern parts of the city of San Diego like Rancho Bernardo, Rancho Peñasquitos, and Carmel Valley to be part of North County as well.

Both coastal and inland North County contain two types of topography. In coastal areas of North County, the land is generally flat with low rolling hills. The beaches are sandy with occasional tidepools and rocky reefs. In some cases, the coast is dominated by bluff type geography, where the land meeting the ocean sharply drops into the sea with a short beach. In some cases, such as in Encinitas, a whole city is bisected by a coastal foothill ridge. The foothills of mountains soon become visible as one travels further east and encounters the rocky peaks of inland North County. Such peaks include San Marcos Mountain, Palomar Mountain, Twin Peaks in Poway, Mount Woodson in Ramona, and Iron Mountain in unincorporated territory. The coastal area also becomes more rugged to the north, where the Santa Margarita Mountains dominate the area within the Marine Corps Base Camp Pendleton.

North San Diego County is known as one of the most geographically diverse places on earth, with bluffs, sandy beaches, canyons and rolling hills on the coast, humid inland valleys, rocky foothills, temperate mountains, rolling grassland and large lakes and rivers in the interior, and arid deserts, lush oases and sand dunes in the far east region.

Rivers and creeks that flow west from the mountains farther inland mostly end up draining into the region's four main lagoons. Throughout their course, these rivers are interrupted by many lakes and reservoirs which support an array of native species.

Spanning  in the northwestern corner of the county, Marine Corps Base Camp Pendleton forms a large buffer separating the coastal populated areas of North County from neighboring Orange County, preventing the creation of a complete coastal megalopolis stretching from Santa Monica to Imperial Beach.

Ecology

The region has strong ties to its coastline and has made notable efforts to preserve many marine environments, including lagoons and tidal wetlands, many of those being the final few on the South Coast. Unlike developments in many Orange County coastal cities, the lagoons and large areas of coast have not yet been so heavily developed. Major lagoons and inlets lining the coast from north to south include: Oceanside Harbor, Buena Vista Lagoon, Agua Hedionda Lagoon, Batiquitos Lagoon and San Elijo Lagoon.

Flora and fauna
The lagoons provide valuable wetland habitat for many birds, reptiles, fish, and plant species. The waters off the coast are also very rich in species diversity, supporting large kelp forests and rocky reefs.

Fish species included the tidewater goby, topsmelt, striped mullet, surfperch and Pacific staghorn sculpin. Leopard sharks forage near the lagoons, and their pups frequent the shallow rocky reefs off the coast.

Bird species included the great blue heron, snowy plover, Ridgway's rail and least tern. The lagoons support various species of shorebirds, wading birds, waterfowl, raptors and diving birds. The number of bird species in the San Dieguito wetlands have tripled due to restoration projects by Del Mar.

The Torrey Pine is also one of the most infamous trees in the region.

Culture

Recreation
North County contains forty golf courses, including Torrey Pines, which hosted the 2008 U.S. Open. North County is also known for its beaches, which stretch about thirty miles from Del Mar to San Onofre. These beaches experience a large tourist influx from June to November. Symbolic of North County's surf culture are the various statues proliferating the region including the Cardiff Kook in Cardiff-by-the-Sea. As surf culture is an integral part of North County, so is equestrian culture. Numerous equestrian centers, including the Del Mar Fairgrounds, Rancho Camino Equestrian Center, and San Diego Country Estates International Equestrian Center, are found in the region from Del Mar to San Diego Country Estates.

North County is home to Southern California's only five-star and five-diamond restaurants: Addison at The Grand Del Mar, and El Bizcocho at Rancho Bernardo Inn.

Fairs and shopping
The Del Mar Fairgrounds is home to one of the most famous racetracks in the world and is the site of the annual San Diego County Fair. Shopping malls include the Westfield North County in Escondido and The Shoppes at Carlsbad in Carlsbad. The Cedros Design District in Solana Beach offers more than 85 shops, boutiques and galleries that specialize in antiques, handmade jewelry, unique artifacts, fine art, and more. Famous beaches include Moonlight Beach in Encinitas and the Oceanside Pier.

In the media
Locations in North County appear in popular television and films. Camp Pendleton is often featured in military-themed shows such as NCIS: Los Angeles, and is the setting of the first season of Major Dad. The Del Mar Fair is also portrayed in shows such as Entourage. Veronica Mars is set in a fictional city north of San Diego; much of the show was filmed in Oceanside. Other crime-related shows, such as TNT's Animal Kingdom and Netflix's American Vandal, are filmed and set in Oceanside. For two seasons the Showtime comedy Weeds was set in the fictional San Diego suburb of Ren Mar, which is implied to be in North County. The Big Bang Theory, which is set in Pasadena, features an episode ("The Zarnecki Incursion") where the main characters make a three-hour drive to Carlsbad to confront a World of Warcraft hacker.

A notable fictional character from North County is shock jock Dave Rickards' "Aunt Edna", frequently featured on the popular Dave, Shelly, and Chainsaw radio program, which airs in the San Diego area.

Demographics
North County is considered wealthier and more conservative than the city of San Diego and has traditionally leaned toward the Republican Party. In recent decades, however, like many highly-educated metropolitan regions throughout the United States, the region has shifted toward the Democratic Party and political liberalism more generally. This shift has been most pronounced along the coast, while some inland communities continue to lean Republican, particularly more rural ones.

In North County,  white-collar jobs outnumber blue-collar jobs at a ratio of 3:1. More people have Bachelor of Arts degrees than associate's degrees at a ratio of 2:1. More people are married than single by 2:1. Statistics compiled by the San Diego County Health and Human Services Agency reveal that coastal North County is 59% white, 18% Hispanic and 6% Asian, with blacks and people of other races less than 5%. Inland North County has roughly the same racial makeup, except that 9% are Asian. 19% of coastal North County residents make more than $100,000 per year, and 44% make less than $45,000, with the rest in the medium income range. Inland North County income stats are largely the same, except that only 42% make less than $45,000.

Communities

The populations listed are from the 2020 census.

Cities
 Oceanside - 174,068
 Escondido - 151,038
 Carlsbad - 114,746
 Vista - 98,381
 San Marcos - 94,833
 Encinitas - 62,007
 Poway - 48,841
 Solana Beach - 12,941
 Del Mar - 3,954

Census-designated places (CDPs)
 Fallbrook - 32,267
 Camp Pendleton South - 12,468
 San Diego Country Estates - 10,395
 Valley Center - 10,087
 Camp Pendleton Mainside - 9,683
 Lake San Marcos - 5,328
 Bonsall - 4,546
 Hidden Meadows - 4,484
 Rancho Santa Fe - 3,156
 Fairbanks Ranch - 3,002
 Harmony Grove - 2,079
 Rainbow - 1,884
 Pala - 1,490
 Elfin Forest - 600
 Del Dios - 396

Other unincorporated communities
 4S Ranch
 De Luz
 De Luz Heights
 Jesmond Dene
 Pala Mesa
 Pauma Valley
 Rincon

Education

Primary and secondary

School districts in the region include the:

 Bonsall Union School District
 Cardiff School District
 Carlsbad Unified School District
 Encinitas Union School District
 Escondido Union School District
 Escondido Union High School District
 Fallbrook Union High School District
 Oceanside Unified School District
 Poway Unified School District
 Ramona Unified School District
 San Dieguito Union High School District
 San Pasqual Union School District
 San Marcos Unified School District
 Valley Center-Pauma Unified School District
 Vista Unified School District

School districts often overlap city boundaries. Depending on the ZIP Codes of the cities and their proximity to respective schools and school districts, school districts will serve parts of different cities.

Colleges and universities
North County is home to several colleges:
 California State University, San Marcos (CSUSM), four-year university in San Marcos, offering undergraduate, graduate, and doctorate programs
 Palomar College, a community college based in San Marcos, with six other education sites in North San Diego County
 MiraCosta College, a community college in Oceanside.

Media

Newspaper

In 1995, several local newspapers merged to form the North County Times. This newspaper served the region until 2012, when it was purchased by Doug Manchester and became an edition of the San Diego Union-Tribune. On March 7, 2013, the separate U-T North County Times name was dropped and a U-T North County edition produced which further integrates U-T with North County-specific pages, while eliminating differences between the two.

Radio
In addition to being served by radio stations from San Diego and Tijuana, North County is served by FM stationsKSSX, KMYI, KLQV, KARJ, KSSD, KKLJ, and KSDW and AM stations KFSD, KPRZ, and KKSM. Several Los Angeles stations can also be picked up, including KYSR, KIIS-FM, KBIG KLYY,and KDLD

Television
North County is served by the ABC affiliate KGTV, CBS and CW affiliate KFMB, NBC affiliate KNSD, and FOX affiliate KSWB—all San Diego stations. Other local stations include KUSI in San Diego

Landmarks
Important landmarks in North County include Del Mar Racetrack, Mission San Luis Rey de Francia, Lake San Marcos, Oceanside Pier, Twin Peaks, and Palomar Mountain, home of the Palomar Observatory.

Politics
North County is represented at the federal level by Representatives Darrell Issa (R–48th district), Mike Levin (D–49th district), and Scott Peters (D–50th district). 

At the state level, North County is represented by State Senators Brian Jones (R–38th district), Patricia Bates (R–36th district), and Toni Atkins (D–39th district).

Most of North County is located within County Supervisorial District 5, and is represented on the county's Board of Supervisors by Jim Desmond, formerly the mayor of San Marcos. The remainder of North County is in Districts 2 and 3, represented by Joel Anderson and Terra Lawson-Remer, respectively.

See also
 East County
 South Bay

References

External links

 
 San Diego North Convention & Visitors Bureau
 City of Oceanside
 City of Escondido
 City of Carlsbad
 City of Vista
 City of San Marcos 
 City of Encinitas
 City of Poway
 City of Solana Beach
 City of Del Mar

 

.
Regions of California